Val Rapava-Ruskin (born 12 October 1992) is an English rugby union player currently playing for Gloucester in the Premiership Rugby.

Early career
Val Rapava Ruskin has been in many clubs around the world. He left his native Georgia when he was two years old and grew up in England. His first club was Blackheath. In 2011, he moved to South Africa and joined Western Province to play U19 Currie Cup. He captained Georgia U19 the same year. Then, he was back in England and played a few games for Saracens Storm in the A-League. In 2013, he moved to French giants Toulon, playing for their (U23) team

Professional career
During his season with Toulon, Val Rapava Ruskin had a trial for Worcester Warriors. He made his first professional appearance for the club the 20 September 2014 against Doncaster at just 21 years old. Since his debut, he has scored five tries in the RFU Championship, including two against Rotherham Titans in October 2014. On 10 January 2017, Ruskin left Worcester at Sixways to join local rivals Gloucester from the 2017-18 season.

In June 2019 he was one of four uncapped players named in England's preliminary World Cup training squad.

Career statistics
.

References

http://www.worcesternews.co.uk/sport/wrfc/11530333.Worcester_Warriors__Georgian_prop_Val_Rapava_Ruskin_eyes_international_chance/
http://www.warriors.co.uk/rugby/players/index.php?player=118285&includeref=dynamic
http://www.sport24.co.za/Rugby/CurrieCup/Georgian-to-be-WPs-player-23-20110720

1992 births
Living people
Rugby union props
Expatriate rugby union players from Georgia (country)
Expatriate rugby union players in England
Expatriate rugby union players in France
Expatriate rugby union players in South Africa
Expatriate sportspeople from Georgia (country) in France
Expatriate sportspeople from Georgia (country) in England